Sant Miquel de Solterra or Sant Miquel de les Formigues is the highest mountain of the Guilleries Massif, Catalonia, Spain. It has an elevation of 1,201.9 metres above sea level.

See also
Guilleries
Catalan Pre-Coastal Range
Catalan Transversal Range
Espai Natural de les Guilleries-Savassona
Mountains of Catalonia

References

Mountains of Catalonia